The 1905 Villanova Wildcats football team represented the Villanova University during the 1905 college football season. Led by second-year head coach Fred Crolius, Villanova compiled a record of 3–7. The team's captain was William Moore.

Schedule

References

Villanova
Villanova Wildcats football seasons
Villanova Wildcats football